Cinco dedos (Spanish for five fingers) is a common name for several plants and may refer to:

Quararibea asterolepis, a timber tree 
Quararibea pterocalyx, a species of flowering plant